Sanayi is an at-grade station on the Fahrettin Altay—Evka 3 Line of the İzmir Metro in Bornova. It is located in the Kazımdirik neighborhood adjacent to Üniversite Avenue. The area around Sanayi station consists of mostly warehouses with a few apartment buildings. The station opened on 22 May 2000 as part of the ten original stations on the İzmir Metro.

History

Sanayi was originally a railway station on the Bornova suburban line known as 2. Sanayi railway station. The station was built by the Smyrna Cassaba Railway (SCP) and opened on 25 October 1866.  Trains from Basmane station to Bornova stopped at Sanayi. Since the Bornova Branch was never extended, the station and the line remained a suburban railway. The Turkish State Railways (TCDD) took over the SCP in 1934 and continued operating commuter service on the railway. TCDD sold the railway to the İzmir Municipality in 1994 and Sanayi, along with the railway, was closed down. The Municipality began construction of the İzmir Metro in 1995 and Sanayi station was demolished. The new station was built on the existing right-of-way shortly after. Construction was completed in 1999 and the station was inaugurated on 22 May 2000, along with the metro line from Bornova to Üçyol.

Connections
ESHOT operates city bus service on Üniversite Avenue.

References

İzmir Metro
Railway stations opened in 1866
1866 establishments in the Ottoman Empire
Railway stations opened in 2000
2000 establishments in Turkey
Railway stations in İzmir Province